Taiwan under Chinese rule can refer to: 

 Kingdom of Tungning
 Taiwan under Qing rule
 Taiwan, governed by the Republic of China
 Taiwan Province, People's Republic of China, theoretical province of the PRC